The 1959–60 season was the 45th in the history of the Isthmian League, an English football competition.

At the end of the previous season Romford were transferred to the Southern Football League, while Maidstone United were newly admitted to the league from Athenian League.

Tooting & Mitcham United were champions, winning their second Isthmian League title.

League table

References

Isthmian League seasons
I